Moggallāna I was King of Anuradhapura in the 6th century, whose reign lasted from 497 to 515. After defeating his brother Kashyapa I in a civil war, he replaced Kashyapa as King of Anuradhapura, and was succeeded by his son Kumara Dhatusena.

Under his reign there were two schools of Theravāda Buddhism: the Dhammaruci (Joy in the Dhamma), living in the Maha-vihara, and the Sāgali School. The latter school had monks (bhikkhu) as well as nuns (bhikkhuni). Moggallāna I "built a shelter for (them and) called it Rājinī" (Queens [abode]).

See also
 List of Sri Lankan monarchs
 History of Sri Lanka

References

External links
 Kings & Rulers of Sri Lanka
 Codrington's Short History of Ceylon

Monarchs of Anuradhapura
M
M
M
M